The 2012 Philippine Peace Cup was the inaugural edition of the tournament, four-nation international football competition organized by the Philippine Football Federation (PFF).  It was originally slated for October 12–16 but the PFF moved it to September 25–29 to give way to the participation of local side Loyola Meralco Sparks in the 2012 Singapore Cup. ABS-CBN covered the games on Studio 23.

The tournament was due to be the third annual Long Teng Cup, however, the organizers, the Chinese Taipei Football Association (CTFA), withdrew from staging the 2012 edition and requested the PFF to host it.  The PFF then renamed it as the Paulino Alcántara Cup, after Filipino–Spanish football legend who played for FC Barcelona.  It was again renamed to the Paulino Alcántara Peace Cup and eventually to the Philippine Peace Cup as the Philippine Sports Commission, which operates the Rizal Memorial Stadium where the tournament will be held, has a rule against events named after an individual.  The month of September is also peace month in the Philippines and the tournament saw involvement of the office of the presidential adviser on the country's peace process.

After 99 years, the Philippines won their first international title since the 1913 Far Eastern Games.

Competing teams
This tournament was due to be the third staging of the Long Teng Cup, all four participants of the tournament were to take part. However, Hong Kong withdrew from participating with Pakistan initially being mooted as their replacement. The PFF then invited Guam which they eventually accepted, thus replacing Hong Kong as the fourth team.

The four national teams that will take part are:

Venue
The tournament was supposed to be held at Panaad Stadium in Bacolod, Negros Occidental. This was due to it supposedly being more financially feasible and that renovations were going to take place from August to September at Rizal Memorial Stadium. However, at the end of August 2012, PFF president Mariano Araneta announced that it will be moved back to the Rizal Memorial Stadium because the project, funded by FIFA which will turn the football field into an artificial turf, didn’t push through. Araneta added that conducting the tournament in Manila will lessen the expenses of the PFF in the event, which is estimated at ₱6 million.

Matches
All times listed are UTC+8.

Group A

Awards
The following were awarded by the PFF after the tournament:

Top Goalscorers
4 goals
  Denis Wolf

2 goals
  Marcus Lopez
  Patrick Reichelt

1 goal

 Chang Han
 Lo Chih-an
 Lo Chih-en
 Yang Chao-hsun
 Dylan Naputi
 Chan Kin Seng
 Ricardo Torrão
 Emelio Caligdong
 Carli de Murga
 OJ Porteria

1 own goal
  Scott Guerrero (against Chinese Taipei)

References

2012
2012 in Philippine football